Yakir is a Hebrew name. Notable people with the name include:

 Iona Yakir (1896–1937), Red Army commander
 Yakir Aharonov (born 1932), Israeli physicist
 Yakir Gueron (1813–1874), Turkish rabbi

See also
 
 

Hebrew masculine given names
Hebrew-language surnames